San Kamphaeng is a district (amphoe) of Chiang Mai province in northern Thailand.

Geography
San Kamphaeng borders the districts (from west clockwise) Saraphi, Mueang Chiang Mai, San Sai, Doi Saket, Mae On of Chiang Mai Province and Ban Thi of Lamphun province.

History
The district dates back to khwaeng Mae Om, which was established in 1902. In 1923 the district was renamed San Kamphaeng.

Administration
The district is divided into 10 sub-districts (tambons), which are further subdivided into 100 villages (mubans). There are two townships (thesaban tambons). San Kamphaeng covers parts of tambons San Kamphaeng and Chae Chang, and the entire tambon Sai Mun. Ton Pao covers the entire tambon of Ton Pao. There are a further eight tambon administrative organizations (TAO).

Numbers 7–9,14,15 are tambons which now belong to Mae On district.

San Kamphaeng